WVVH-CD, virtual and UHF digital channel 18, is a class A television station, licensed to Southampton, New York. The station is owned by Greg and Ernie Schmizzi, doing business as Video Voice Inc., and runs programming from YTA TV and Outside TV. The station's studios are located in East Hampton, New York and its transmitter is located in Sag Harbor, New York.

History
Founded in 1983, but it sign on as an affiliate of Channel America in 1988. Brothers Greg and Ernie Schimizzi, doing business as Video Voice, brought W23AA from David Post changing the call signs to WVVH-LP on October 4, 1994. In 2001, WVVH-LP moved to channel 50 since WFTY (channel 67) would be broadcasting its digital signal on channel 23 and could potentially cause interference to WVVH. In 2003, the station signed to become an affiliate of the Omni Broadcasting Network.

In 2004, the station began streaming its programming online.

On November 15, 2005, the station applied for a construction permit to begin digital broadcasting on its existing channel 50.

In 2007, a consortium from its home base in the Hamptons, acquired Resort Sports Network with an eye towards expanding the network's shows with broadcasts from WVVH about the lifestyles options at resorts.

The station changed its call letters to WVVH-CA on April 15, 2008, this reflected its change from a low-power (LP) station to a Class A station (CA). The station changed its call sign again on October 21, 2011, to the current WVVH-CD.

Programming

In addition to its network programming, WVVH-CD also shows local programming, such as the Hampton Classic Horse Show, Hamptons International Film Festival, and the Bridgehampton Road Rally, as well as the talk show In The Mixx, which premiered in summer 2012. At one time, WVVH maintained a local newscast, but eventually began carrying INN News. WVVH also carried the syndicated The Daily Buzz program on weekday mornings.

Technical Information 

The station's digital signal is multiplexed:

References

External links
Official site

East Hampton (town), New York
VVH-CD
Television channels and stations established in 1983
Mass media in Suffolk County, New York
Low-power television stations in the United States
YTA TV affiliates